Yor-yor  or Gde ty, moya Zulfiya? (transliteration of the Russian title of the film meaning "Where are You, My Zulfiya?") is a 1964 Uzbek comedy produced by Ali Hamroyev. The film is considered to be one of the best Uzbek comedies and has been dubbed the "national comedy."

Plot
Baxtiyor (played by Baxtiyor Ixtiyorov) falls in love with a girl (Zulfiya) that he sees on TV. Deciding to find her, Baxtiyor travels across the Uzbek SSR with his father. They meet many different people and experience both funny and sad adventures, but do not find Zulfiya. Upon returning to Tashkent, Baxtiyor and his family move to a new flat from their old house which was located in an old part of the city. In the closing scene, Baxtiyor finds out that he and Zulfiya are neighbors in the new apartment block.

References

External links
 
A gallery of screenshots from Gde ty, moya Zulfiya?

1964 films
1964 musical comedy films
Soviet-era Uzbek films
Uzbekfilm films
Uzbek-language films
Uzbekistani comedy films
Soviet musical comedy films